Siddharth N. "Bobby" Mehta is the former CEO and vice chairman of HSBC North America. Mehta served as an Advisor of TransUnion since December 31, 2012. Mehta serves as consultant of TransUnion.

He served the chief executive officer and president of TransUnion from August 2007 to December 2012, and Transunion Financing Corp. until December 31, 2012. From May 2007 to July 2007, he served as a consultant to the board of directors at TransUnion. From 1998 to 2007, he held a variety of positions with HSBC Finance Corporation and HSBC North America Holdings, Inc. Mehta served as chief executive officer of HSBC North America until February 2007. Mehta served as consultant of TransUnion since May 2007 until July 2007. Mehta served as group managing director of HSBC Holdings PLC of HSBC Finance Corp. since April 30, 2005, and its unit chief executive officer since March 2005.

He served as the chief executive of HSBC North America Holdings Inc., of HSBC Finance Corp., from March 2005 to February 2007. He served as an executive chairman of HSBC Financial Corporation Limited since April 2005 and served as its chief executive officer from April 2005 to February 15, 2007. He served as the chief executive officer of HSBC Bank USA, N.A. until February 2007. He oversaw HSBC's global credit card services, its North American consumer lending and mortgage services businesses and its first mortgage operation. He was also responsible for corporate marketing, strategic planning and corporate development for HSBC North America Holdings Inc. and had responsibility for the strategic management of credit cards throughout the HSBC Group.

Mehta served as group executive of Credit Card Services, Auto Finance and Canada of Household International Inc., since July 2002. He worked at MasterCard's U.S. region board since March 2000. Mehta joined Household International Inc., in 1998. He served as senior vice president of The Boston Consulting Group in Los Angeles and co-leader of Boston Consulting Group Financial Services Practice in the United States. Mehta served as a director of Global Board of MasterCard Incorporated since March 17, 2005. He served as unit chairman of HSBC Holdings PLC and served as its board member since March 2005. He served as vice chairman and director of HSBC Financial Corporation Limited., (Formerly Household International Inc.).

He has been a director of Avant Credit Corporation since December 18, 2014. He has been an independent director of The Allstate Corporation since February 2014. He serves as a member of the advisory board at Core2 Group, Inc. He has been non-executive independent director at Piramal Enterprises Ltd since April 2013.

He serves on the boards of Datacard, Chicago Public Education Fund, University of Chicago Laboratory Schools, The Economic Club of Chicago, The Field Museum and Myelin Repair Foundation. He serves as a director of TransUnion Corp. and TransUnion LLC. He served as a director of MasterCard International Inc. (also known as MasterCard Worldwide) (formerly, MasterCard Inc.), since March 17, 2005. He served as a director of HSBC Financial Corp. Ltd. He has been a director of TransUnion since April 2012.

Mehta serves on the board of international advisors for the Monterey, California, Institute of International Studies and is a member of the Financial Services Roundtable. He also serves on the board of advisors for the Myelin Repair Foundation. Mehta holds a Bachelor of Arts in economics from the London School of Economics and Masters of Business Administration from the University of Chicago. He stepped down as head of the North American unit after the lender raised its forecast for bad loans in the U.S. He is of Indian descent.

References 

American people of Indian descent
American businesspeople
Year of birth missing (living people)
Living people